The Battle of Rimini took place between 13 and 21 September 1944 during Operation Olive, the main Allied offensive on the Gothic Line in August and September 1944, part of the Italian Campaign in the Second World War. Rimini, a town on the Adriatic coast of Italy, anchored the Rimini Line, a German defensive line which was the third such line forming the Gothic Line defences.

Rimini, which had been hit previously by 373 air raids, had 1,470,000 rounds fired against it by allied land forces; by the end of the battle, only 2% of all buildings in the city were still undamaged.

Background
On 23 August 1944 the Eighth Army launched Operation Olive, attacking on a three Corps front up the eastern flank of Italy into the Gothic Line defences. By the first week in September the offensive had broken through the forward defences of the Gothic Line and the defensive positions of the Green I line and United States Fifth Army entered the offensive in central Italy attacking towards Bologna.

In the Eighth Army's centre 1st Canadian Corps had broken through Green II on the right of its front advancing to pinch out the Polish Corps on the very right of the army (and allowing the latter to be withdrawn to army reserve) but inland in the hills the Corps' advance had been held up by stubborn defence at Coriano and V Corps on the army's left flank had been halted at Croce and Gemmano. A new attack to clear the Green II positions in the hills and destroy the Rimini Line running from the port of Rimini inland to San Marino was scheduled to start on 12 September.

Battle of Rimini

Just south of Rimini, attached to  1st Canadian Division, was 3rd Greek Mountain Brigade (ΙΙΙ Ε.Ο.Τ.), a unit of mountain infantry formed by the Greek government in exile on 1 July 1944 in Lebanon under the command of Colonel Thrasyvoulos Tsakalotos. Near the village of Cattolica they pushed back two strong German attacks on 8 and 10 September. On 13 September the brigade, supported by the combined armour and infantry of B squadron, 20th New Zealand Armoured Regiment and 22 New Zealand Motor Battalion from 2nd New Zealand Division, launched a counterattack to take Rimini. Also supporting the brigade were infantry, mortars and machine guns from the Canadian Saskatoon Light Infantry (SLI) and New Zealand 33 Anti-tank battery fielding 17pdr guns.

The initial attack on 13 September saw the Greeks attacking two small farm settlements on the Marano road. The two settlements (Monaldini and Monticelli) were defended by 1st Parachute Regiment (1. Fallschirmjäger Regiment) and some Osttruppen described as Turkomen (likely a Turkestani Ostlegion battalion from the 162nd Turkoman Division). The Germans were well prepared and held off the Greeks.

The following day 7 and 8 Troop of the B Squadron, 20th Armoured Regiment were added to the attack on Monaldini, while soon after a platoon from 22nd Motor Battalion aided the attack on Monticelli with the support of 5 and 6 Troops' Sherman tanks. By 2000 hours the Monaldini farm had been taken, with only light casualties. The focus then turned to Monticelli, where the Greeks and New Zealanders once again attacked. The German defenders cleared out of the position as soon as the attackers approached and the farm was in Allied hands a short time later.

On 15 September the Greeks launched an assault on the Rimini airfield. The 1st Greek Battalion crossed the Marano River (a stream with only a gentle flow of water) at 1000 hours, and immediately came under intense fire from German positions around the airfield. The Greeks halted to re-organise themselves for an attack. C Squadron, 18th New Zealand Armoured Regiment relieved B Squadron 20th Armoured Regiment in the line supporting the Greeks. Air support was called in and Allied fighter/bombers attacked the western side of the airfield, and the Greeks attacked shortly afterwards.

The 1st Greek Battalion attacked the airfield itself, the 2nd Greek Battalion then attacked up the Route 16 road and the 3rd Battalion attacked the small village of Casalecchio.

The 1st Greek Battalion once more ran into stiff resistance from the airfield defenders. Fire from airfield inflicted heavy casualties on the advancing Greeks, however support from the New Zealand tanks and infantry was better co-ordinated as one of the New Zealand officers spoke Greek. The tanks were able to fire on each house lining the south of the airfield to ensure they weren't occupied. As the Greeks and New Zealanders approached the defensive positions they came under fire from infantry, anti-tank rockets (Panzerschrecks), self-propelled guns, and emplaced Panther turrets. The heavy fire pinned the advance just short of the airfield. Meanwhile, the tanks edged around a hedgerow to avoid the anti-tank fire, but soon found themselves at the forefront of the attack. A German self-propelled gun knocked out a Sherman, but the New Zealanders continued forward and knocked out enemy positions with high-explosives and grenades, forcing the Germans to withdraw from their positions. The crew of a Panther turret abandoned it during the night.

The 2nd Greek Battalion, on the right of the brigade, attacked up the Route 16 road, but became separated from their supporting New Zealand tanks. The Greeks were halted by mines and heavy defensive fire from the east side of the airfield and nearby houses. The 3rd Greek Battalion attacked the village of Casalecchio on the left flank, supported by New Zealand tanks and infantry. The little village stood on a crossroads with a few houses and a church. The Greek infantry quickly cleared the houses, but the paratroops in the church proved harder to move. The church was finally cleared when a combined attack by Greek and New Zealand infantry and tanks drove the paratroopers out. However heavy machine-gun and mortar fire from the airfield halted any further advance. The following day (16 September) the Greeks continued to mop up around the airfield, most of which they held, though one Panther turret was still in operation. The 3rd Greek Battalion advanced up the left through the hedges and ditches beyond Casalecchio until they came level with the 1st Greek Battalion in the centre. Their task was made difficult as they had occasionally to clear minefields and were under constant fire. The 2nd Greek Battalion advanced up the right flank of the airfield. Anti-tank fire was lighter than the previous day.

The following day (17 September) the three battalions continued their advance. Several attempts were made to knock out the remaining Panther turret with aircraft and artillery, but it finally fell to one of the New Zealand Shermans working around its flank. It fired several anti-tank rounds into the turret before the crew eventually evacuated. Once the airfield was taken the 3rd Greek Mountain Brigade turned its attention towards Rimini itself.  On 18 September the 2nd and 3rd Battalions pushed on to Rimini, towards the coastal suburbs of the town. They encountered heavy resistance once again from the German paratroops, but with the aid of New Zealand and Canadian support were finally able to push into the outskirts of the town on 20 September. They pushed on into Rimini from the south, only to find the city abandoned by the Germans who had been forced to withdraw by the outflanking threat created by the fall of San Fortunato to 1st Canadian Division.

On the morning of 21 September the 2nd Greek Battalion reached the city centre via the Ausa River and raised the Greek flag on the balcony of the municipal building. At 7:45 of 21 September the mayor unconditionally surrendered the city to the 3rd Greek Mountain Brigade with an official protocol that is written in Greek, English and Italian.

The actions of the Greek brigade during the battle earned it the honorific title "Rimini Brigade".

Notes
Citations

References
 
 
 
 
 
 
 The Greek Army in World War II Army General Staff/History Directorate Edition

External links
 
 Italy Volume II : From Cassino to Trieste

World War II operations and battles of the Italian Campaign
Italy in World War II
Rimini
Battles of World War II involving Canada
Battles and operations of World War II involving Greece
Battles of World War II involving New Zealand
Battles of World War II involving Germany
September 1944 events
Rimini